iAd Producer was introduced by Apple Inc. in 2010 as a new authoring tool for designing and developing interactive iAd using HTML5, CSS3, and JavaScript standards for distribution through its iAd network within iOS apps. iAd and by extension iAd Producer were both discontinued in June 2016.

iAd Producer offers a single-window interface for viewing and editing layouts and settings of iAd rich media ad projects. It gives each access to project templates with pre-built structure including banners, splash pages, and menus. An extensive library of pre-built interactive elements – carousels, galleries, maps, videos and more – which are available for use using simple drag and drop. Sophisticated object animation tools are available to use through the GUI using a timeline that is very easy to manage as it only shows events on the timeline and not the dead time in between them. The app also doubles as an IDE, by offering advanced JavaScript code editing and debugging with full syntax highlighting and code completion. One can even write their own plugin to provide additional functionality for use in their projects. For testing purposes, iAd Producer leverages Mac OS X, Safari, the iOS simulator and hardware iOS devices.

Version History

Since version 2.0, Apple has maintained an archive of iAd Producer release notes.

References

External links 
 

Animation software
Web development software
2D animation software
Rich web application frameworks
Apple Inc. software